Aguas Calientes Volcano or Cerro Aguas Calientes, also called Simba, is a cone-shaped stratovolcano located  east of the Lascar volcano and  north of Laguna Lejía, Chile. It is located within a  area where the Cordón de Puntas Negras and the Cordón Chalviri volcanic chains intersect. The volcano is constructed from andesite and dacite containing hornblende and also anhydrite and its pyroclastics are all older than Lascar. Some xenoliths of calc-alkaline material are found in Aguas Calientes lavas, and magma mixing has generated lavas containing andesite inclusions in dacites. One eruption of Aguas Calientes postdates the first centre of Lascar and was originally linked to the Lascar Piedras Grandes eruption, before sampling on the deposits of this eruption indicated a relationship with the Lascar volcano itself. Effusion of lava ceased after the cone was built. One summit lava flow may be of Holocene age, but no evidence of historical activity is found (González-Ferrán 1985).

The volcano has been affected by glaciation. Glacial U-shaped valleys are found on the northern and western flanks, giving the volcano some angular patterns. One valley with glacial features and a subglacial river channel at  altitude is found on the northern flank. It extends down to the valley north of Aguas Calientes and intersects the youngest lavas of the volcano.

Aguas Calientes has a well formed summit crater. The lake water is acidic and is frequently influenced by activity from Lascar, with winds carrying sulfuric acid and water vapour clouds to the crater lake. The lake has a bacterial ecosystem that is primarily reliant on photosynthesis but may also be influenced by hydrothermal activity from Aguas Calientes volcano. Research has found only limited numbers of bacterial taxa and a large number of DNA sequences that can't be identified as known phylogenetic groups. The lake has been studied as a possible terrestrial analogy to Mars.

See also 
 List of volcanoes in Chile

References 

Sources
  (in Spanish; also includes volcanoes of Argentina, Bolivia, and Peru)

Volcanoes of Antofagasta Region
Stratovolcanoes of Chile
Mountains of Chile
Volcanic crater lakes